A referendum on direct election of governors and vice governors was held in American Samoa on 18 June 1974. Voters were asked to approve a proposal which permitted direct popular election of governors and lieutenant governors. The measure was narrowly rejected, with 47% voting yes and 53% voting no. An identical measure would be put before voters again two years later and was passed.

Results
Voters were asked the question "Shall the people of American Samoa elect a governor and lieutenant-governor by popular vote?"

References

Referendums in American Samoa
1974 in American Samoa
American Samoa
Electoral reform referendums